Tae Eul Ju is a sacred mantra used throughout the world by practitioners of Jeung San Do. This mantra consists of twenty-three holy sounds. Jeung San Sangjenim, on whose teachings and spiritual work Jeung San Do is based, shared a meditative and spiritual practice aimed at transforming ourselves and society.

Meaning

Ahn Gyung-jun, the sabunim of Jeung San Do, explains some of the sounds of the mantra as follows:

What is the sound hum? 
According to Buddhism, hum (hoom) is "The mind of the Buddha." Hum (hoom) is the mind of all enlightened beings. When you are immersed in the peaceful hum (hoom) sound, you can attain Buddha-mind.

Sound of chi (chee) 
In Sanskrit, chi (chee) means "To become one with all brilliant spirits existing in the whole universe." Sangjenim was the first to join the sounds hum (hoom) and chi (chee) together. Once they were joined, a new more fantastic meaning took shape. Sangjenim said, "Hum (Hoom) Chi (Chee) is the sound calling the parents of all things in heaven and earth."

How to chant?
Whenever you chant Hum (Hoom) - chi (chee) - hum (hoom) - chi (chee), you should chant with the mind of calling out to your original parents. Some people mistakenly chant it with a sad and depressing voice, as if crying, causing such sad and depressive energy to respond. You should call out to your parents with bright energy.

Tae-eul Heaven
The next part of Tae-eul-ju is Tae-eul-cheon-sang-won-gun. Tae-eul-cheon means "Tae-eul Heaven." All the mysteries in the universe are contained in these three syllables. Tae means "ultimate." Eul signifies the womb of the universe, which gives birth to all things including humanity. Tae Eul Cheon is the ultimate place from which all humans are born. Sang means "heavenly" or "supreme." Won means "fundamental" or "ultimate." Gun (pronounce Goon) means "king." Sang Won Gun is the entity in charge of Tae Eul Heaven, the place in the universe from which life-giving energy comes. What does sa-pa-ha, the last three syllables, mean? It is a beautiful prayer asking that all of our wishes and desires be fulfilled.

Purpose

Jeung San Do's meditation combines the chanting style of Buddhism with the inner alchemy of Taoism. When meditators immerse themselves in the peaceful sound of mantra, they feel a sense of oneness with the universe. Through the internal process of circulating the fire and water energies, the practitioner improves the condition of the body and cultivates spirit.

Four different powers 

Tae Eul Ju has four different powers:

 H (Healing)
 By chanting Tae Eul Mantra, you can heal yourself as well as healing others.

 E (Enlightenment)
 By chanting Tae Eul Mantra, you can reach enlightenment faster than other mantra.

 P (Protection)
 By chanting Tae Eul Mantra, you are protected from evil spirit and bad energy.

 S (Salvation)
 When the time comes, GaeByeok, Tae Eul Ju Mantra will be used to save the world.

See also
 Boeun (Offering Gratitude and Repayment) 報恩
 Cosmic Year
 Shao Yung
 Dojang Dao center 道場
 Dojeon Sacred text of Jeung San Do 道典
 Gaebyeok 
 Haewon (Resolution of Bitterness and Grief) 解怨
 Jeung San Do
 Sangjenim 上帝
 Sangsaeng (Mutual life-giving) 相生
 Taemonim 太母
 Wonsibanbon (Returning to the Origin) 原始反本

Notes

External links
 Jeung San Do website

Jeung San Do
Mantras